Mary Beth Zimmerman (born December 11, 1960) is an American professional golfer who played on the LPGA Tour.

Zimmerman won four times on the LPGA Tour between 1986 and 1995.

Professional wins

LPGA Tour (4)

LPGA Tour playoff record (1–2)

References

External links

American female golfers
LPGA Tour golfers
Golfers from Illinois
People from Mount Vernon, Illinois
1960 births
Living people